Mourad Fahmy (1 July 1910-1 September 1983) was an Egyptian football coach who helped Egypt to their first African Cup of Nations victory.

Biography

Mourad Fahmy was a football player for Al Ahly. Between 1955 and 1958 Fahmy was coach of the Egyptian national football team. He led Egypt to the inaugural African Cup of Nations in 1957.
 After retiring from coaching, Mourad Fahmy became a founding member of the Confederation of African Football (CAF). Fahmy was the general secretary of CAF between 1961 and 1982. Fahmy was also minister of Agriculture under President Nasser. Mourad Fahmy died in 1983 whilst attending a CAF meeting in Abidjan.

Personal life
Mourad Fahmy was grandfather to Amr Fahmy.

Honors
1957 African Cup of Nations

References 

1910 births
1983 deaths
Footballers from Cairo
Egypt national football team managers
Al Ahly SC players
Egyptian footballers
Agriculture Ministers of Egypt
Egyptian football managers
Egyptian sports executives and administrators
Association football executives
Association football defenders
1957 African Cup of Nations managers